Scopesis is a genus of parasitoid wasps belonging to the family Ichneumonidae.

The species of this genus are found in Europe and Northern America.

Species:
 Scopesis alpivagans Heinrich, 1949 
 Scopesis areolaris (Pfankuch, 1921)

References

Ichneumonidae
Ichneumonidae genera